Elaine Agnew (born 1967) is an Irish composer.

Early life
Elaine Agnew studied composition at Queen’s University Belfast with Kevin Volans and at the Royal Conservatoire of Scotland with James MacMillan.

Career
Agnew was a commissioned composer at the 2012 BBC Proms. ‘Dark Hedges’ was premiered by the Ulster Youth Orchestra, the Ulster Orchestra and flautist Sir James Galway in London’s Royal Albert Hall.

References

Aosdána members
Living people
1967 births
People from Larne